Edward Bierstadt (September 11, 1824 – June 15, 1906) was a  photographer of portraits and landscapes  as well as an engraver in the United States.

Early life
Bierstadt was born in Solingen, Rhine Province, Prussia on September 11, 1824.  He was the son of Henry Bierstadt (1785–1866), a cooper, and Christiana (née Tilmans) Bierstadt (1792–1864).  His younger brother was noted painter Albert Bierstadt.

As a boy, his family moved to the United States and they settled in New Bedford, Massachusetts.

Career

In 1860, he opened his own studio in New York City along with his brother, Albert Bierstadt, whose artwork he made into engravings. He produced stereoscopic images for Bierstadt Brothers, together with his other older brother Charles Bierstadt.

Bierstadt was hired by William West Durant to take a series of photos for an advertising brochure entitled The Adirondacks, Artotype Views Among the Mountains and Lakes of the North Woods to publicize Blue Mountain Lake and Raquette Lake in the Adirondacks.

Bierstadt held an 1876 patent for an improvement to the stereoscope.  Along with his brother, he produced some stereoscopic photographs from across the country, sometimes credited as the "Bierstadt Brothers".

Bierstadt died in New York City on June 15, 1906.

References

External links

Saint Hubert's Isle - Photographs by Edward Bierstadt
 Internet Archive: Bierstadt, Edward. Picturesque St. Augustine, Views in the Old Florida City, New York: The Artotype Publishing Company, 1891.

1824 births
1906 deaths
Prussian emigrants to the United States
19th-century American photographers
19th-century American inventors
American engravers
People from New Bedford, Massachusetts
Photographers from Massachusetts
Photographers from New York City